Herbert Gerhard Dill (31 December 1908 – 24 April 1942) was a German racewalker. He competed in the men's 50 kilometres walk at the 1936 Summer Olympics.

References

External links
 

1908 births
1942 deaths
Athletes (track and field) at the 1936 Summer Olympics
German male racewalkers
Olympic athletes of Germany